Adrian Waller (born 26 December 1989 in Enfield) is a professional squash player who represents England. He reached a career-high world ranking of World No. 17 in November 2019.

References

External links 
 
 
 

1989 births
Living people
English male squash players
Commonwealth Games medallists in squash
Commonwealth Games silver medallists for England
Squash players at the 2018 Commonwealth Games
Medallists at the 2018 Commonwealth Games